Ìlàje is a Local Government Area in Ondo State, South-West Nigeria. Its headquarters are in the town of Igbokoda. The Ilajes are a distinct migratory coastal linguistic group of Yoruba peoples spread along the coastal belts of Ondo, Ogun, Lagos and Delta states and originally made up of four geo-political entities, namely: Ode Ugbo, Ode Mahin, Ode Etikan and Aheri. While most towns and villages in the Mahin kingdom (Ode Mahin) are distributed on arable lands, the towns and villages in the other three geo-politics of Ugbo, Aheri and Etikan kingdoms are spread out along the beaches and swampy terrains of the Atlantic Ocean coast.

Origins
Ilajes were said to have left Ile Ife, their original ancestral home in the 10th century and migrated southwards towards the littoral coastline of southeastern Yorubaland.  Today, they occupy the entire Atlantic shoreline of Ondo State, Nigeria with a significant proportion of the ilaje populace also settled on lands in the interior behind the coast such as Igbokoda.

Geography
Towards the western reaches, the Aheri and Etikan share border with the Ijebus. The Ikale to the north bound the Mahins, the Itsekiri people who the Ilajes consider their cousins, share the eastern border with the Ugbos, the Yoruba speaking Apoi and Arogbo Ijaws are located to the north east in Ese Odo LGA, and the Atlantic Ocean is situated on the southern boundary. The Ilajes are one of the most dynamic and enterprising people in Nigeria. Their aquatic skill, coupled with their ability to adapt enabled them to conquer their harsh geographical environment and turn it to their advantage. Consequently, they were able to build large communities like Ugbonla, Aiyetoro, Zion PePe and Orioke. Aiyetoro for example in its hey-days had the highest per capita income in the whole of Africa due to its early discovery of crude petroleum, and attracted visitors, tourists and researchers from all over the world.

Apart from petroleum found in the area, other mineral raw materials available in Ilajeland include glass sand, salt, Tar sand/Bitumen, quartz and clay. Agricultural products include: Fish, Poultry, piggery, Maize, Palm oil, Vegetables, Timber, Rafia, Poultry, Copra, cocoyam, Bananas and Cassava.
The natural environment of Ilajeland is particularly suitable for the development of large scale rice plantations and the salt industry. The occupational activities of the Ilajes include fishing, canoe making, lumbering, net making, mat making, launch building, farming and trading. Fishing however remains the major agricultural preoccupation of the Ilaje. This is underscored by the fact that the Ilaje's geographical sphere has one of the longest coastlines in Nigeria. Ilaje's fishing dexterity is underlined by a popular saying among the Ilaje that:

 Ubo ẹri ipa tọ, ilaje gwa to rin 

meaning:

 Where the path of river currents flow through, there you will find the Ilaje.

Thousands of migrant Ilaje fishermen can be found in many other coastal communities all over Nigeria in places like Epe, Escravos, Warri, Badagry, Brass and Nembe.

Igbokoda, the Ilaje local government headquarters is fast becoming an international trade center as its popular market attracts traders not only from other part of Nigeria, but, also from other African countries especially Togo, Benin, Ghana, Cameroon and Gabon. Ilajeland is only about 75 kilometers from Lagos and its aquatic environment present the area as a suitable environment for tourism. It is hoped that the Ondo State government and the government of Nigeria will help develop it into a world class tourist attraction. In the past the entire area suffered serious neglect and marginalization in the hands of the government.  However, it appears that the Ondo State government has come to realize the importance of Ilajeland not only because it is her only outlet to the sea but also because it is her economic power house. The state is now constructing a network of roads linking the area with the hinterland and has promised to provide basic social amenities including electricity and drinking water systems.

The highlight of the Ondo State's recent development efforts is the acquisition of about 200 hectares of land to be developed and built as a satellite town for the people displayed from their homes in towns and villages on the Atlantic coastline as a result of petroleum drilling and exploratory activities.
No doubt, there is a big future for the area especially with the Olokola Development project by Ondo and Ogun State Governments.

Towns
Ugbo Kingdom

Abetobo zion
Abokiti
Ago Alufa
Ago nati
Ajegunle
Alagbom zion
Alagbon
Amehin
Apata ilaje
Asumaga
Awoye
Ayetoro
Bijimi
Bowoto
Eke atiye
Eke baale
Eke didi
Eke ilutitun
Eke itiola
Eke maha
Eke moki
Eke nla
Eke ofolajetan
Eke yonren
Ernna ogbeni
Erunna
Erunna lagbe
Gbagara
Idi-ogba
Idogun
Idogun ayadi
Idogun ehinmore
Ikorigho
Ilepete
Ilowo
Ilowo ayetoro
Ilowo Nla
Ilowo ogunsemore
Iluabo
Imoluwa
Jirinwo
Lepe
Molutehin
Obe Adun
Obe akingboye
Obe apata
Obe Arenewo
Obe Dapo
Obe Enikanselu
Obe ifenla
Obe Iji
Obe Jedo
Obe Magbe
Obe Nla
Obe Ogbaro
Obe Olomore
Obe Orisabinone
Obe Rebimino
Obe Rewoye
Obe Sedara
Odofado
Odonla
Odonla meduoye
Odun Ogungbeje
Odun ojabireni
Odun oriretan
Odun Oyinbo
Odun Yonren
Ogbongboro
Ogboti
Oghoye
Ojumole
Okun ipin
Olotu
Olotu kuwo
Olotu niye
Olotu yara
Orioke Harama
Oroto
Otumara
Otumare se- side
Owoleba
Saheyi
Uba Korigho
Ubale
Ubale kekere
Ubale nla
Ugbage
Ugbo
Ugbonla
Womitenren
Yaye
Zion Ikerigho
Zion Iluabo

Mahin Kingdom

Abealala
Abereke
Aboto
Ago Doroh
Ago Ikuebolati
Ago Lulu
Ago Olomidegun
Akata
Alagbede
Aruwayo
Asisa
Atijere
Betiegbofo
Broke Camp
Ebute Ipare
Ehin - Osa
Elegboro
Ereke
Ereke Majofodun
Ereke Makuleyi
Etigho
Gbabijo
Ibila
Idigho
Igbegunrin
Igbo - Okuta
Igbobi
Igbokoda
Igbolomi
Ikale Camp
Iloro
Ilu Sosi
Imoluwa
Ita - Age
Italita Camp
Itebukunmi
Job Camp
Korolo
Kugbonre
Kurugbene
Legha
Lerenren
Logede Camp
Madagbayi
Magbehinwa
Mogbojuri
Mahin
Mahintedo
Maran
Moferere
Mogunyanje
Motiala
Motoro
Odun Oloja
Odun Oluma
Odun Oroyo
Odunmogun
Ogorogo
Ohaketa Camp
Ojan
Oke Etigho
Okishilo
Okoga
Okunniyi
Olosunmeta
Opolo
Orere - Ara
Oribero
Orimoloye
Orioke Iwamimo
Oriranyin
Orofin Camp
Oropo Zion
Oroyomi
Pete-Inu
Piawo
Ramasilo
Seja Odo
Seja Oke
Seluwa
Tedo Camp
Tomoloju
Tomoloju Camp
Ugbaha
Zion Gbabijo
Zion Igbokoda
Zion Mahintedo
Zion Ogogoro

Etikan Kingdom

Agba Gana
Ago Apeja
Ago Buli
Ago Egun
Ago Festus
Ago Gbobaniyi
Ago Ijebu
Ago Ikumapayi
Ago Iwabi
Ago Lubi
Ago Oluji
Aiyetitun
Araromi Etikan
Igbobi
Ikaji Etikan
Moborode
Obalende Etikan
Ode Etikan
Oja Igo Etikan
Oja oje
Oja Osho
Oja Temidire
Oke Harama
Okonla
Okun Eikan
Ramasilo Etikan
Uba Agba
Uba Akobi
Uba Domi
Uba Etikan
Uba Kalebari
Uba Oke Kelian
Uba Ropeda
Uba Yellow

Aheri Kingdom

Agbala Obi
Agbala Olope Meji
Agerige Town
Agerige Zion
Aheri Camp
Ajebamidele
Akata
Ako Ira-Oba
Alape Junction
Araromi Sea-side
Enu-Ama
Ideghele
Idigbengbin
Igogun
Ihapen
Ilefunfun
Ipare
Ipepe
Mofehintokun
Okesiri
Olopo
Ramasilo
Temidire
Ubalogun
Zion pepe

Igbotu 

Aboromeji
Aboto Camp
Ago
Ago-Ogele
Ago-Yellow
Amayetigba
Araromi
Arigbe Camp
Baale Camp
Bisewe Golote
Ebidlo
Ekohebo Camp
Enikorogha
Epewe
Eredase Camp
Esenoko Camp
Gbabijo
Gunmagun Camp
Hamidifa
Idigba Camp
Igbebomi Iyara
Igbobini
Igbolani-Arubenghan
Igbotu
Igbotu-Atijo
Igbotu-Gbaluwe
Igbotu-Zion
Igirikile
Imobi
Itebetabe Camp
Iyara
Kafawe
Kitikoro
Kolodi Camp
Kurugbene
Lagereke
Laporen Camp
Lobele Camp
Logede
Lumoko Camp
Moboro Village
Odibo
Ogbeni Camp
Ogunmade
Okoro
Okorogbene
Okuru Camp
Olorunsola Camp
Olowo Camp
Oluagbo
Omukoro Camp
Onipanu Ago Bagi
Onisosi
Otarogbene Camp
Pee Camp
Pghono Camp
Piria
Shabomi Babomi
Sogbo Camp
Surulere
Yogha
Zion

Resources
Ilaje Local Government was created out of the defunct Ilaje/Ese-Odo Local Government Area on October 1, 1996 by the federal government. It consists of over four hundred towns and villages, covering an area of 3,000 square kilometers. It shares boundary in the North with Okitipupa Local Government, the south by Atlantic Ocean, in the West by Ogun State and in the East by Delta State. It is covered by troughs and undulating low land surfaces. The extreme South is covered by silt, and mud and superficial sedimentary deposits.

There is sand formation at the Western part of the Local Government extending from the Lekki peninsula in Lagos State to Araromi Sea-side and Zion pepe, Agba to Etugbo and Ipare all, Mahin and Ugbonla the Eastern part of the Local Government Area can boast of the largest coconut plantation in West Africa. Ilaje Local Government is the largest local Government in Ondo State in terms of its landmass. According to the 1991 National Population Census, the Local Government is one of the most populated in Ondo State, with a population figure of 277,034. it has a shoreline covering about 180 km thereby making Ondo State, a state with the longest coastline in Nigeria, Crude oil, which is the mainstay of the Nigerian economy.
Traditionally, it is grouped into 8 kingdoms namely: Mahin land under His Royal Majesty, Amapetu of Mahin, Ugboland which is under His Royal Majesty Olugbo of Ugbo Kingdom. Aheri land under the Maporure and Etikan land under the Onikan of Etikan, Odonla land under the Alagho of Odonla, Obenla land under the Olubo of Obenla, Obe Ogbaro land under the Odoka of Obe Ogbaro, Igbokoda under the Olu of Iggbokoda and Igboegunrin under the Odede of Igboegunrin.

Educational institutions
The Local Government Area has a total of 117 institutions of learning. This comprises 96 primary schools; 20 secondary schools and Technical College at Ayetoro, established by the community itself and the university of science and technology okitipupa established by the ousted governor Olusegun Agagu

Economy

Major industries
Oluwa Glass Company Plc, Igbokoda. This industry made use of the abundance of high quality silica sand that could be found in various parts of the Local Government. The sand account not less than 75% of the raw materials for manufacturing glasses sheet and could be dug in large quantity in Agerige, Akata, Olopemeji, Araromi Sea-side, Zion Pepe, Ode Etikan, Igbokoda Zion, Aboto and Orereara. Only the one at Igbokoda for now solely feeds the Oluwa Glass Factory. Oluwa Glass Company can produce for both export and local consumption and the production should be a veritable source of inspiration to potential investors. Allied industries to the factory can also be established.

Oluwa Glass Company/Factory does not exist anymore.

Petroleum exploration
Crude oil, which is the major source of income in Nigeria, is found in Ilaje Local Government. There are oil wells and fields spread all over the Local Government Area both onshore and offshore, Oil Companies such as Shell, Chevron, Texaco Nigeria Ltd and Consolidated Oil, Express Petroleum and Gas Company, Atlas Oil Company, Allied Energy Oil Company, Cavendish Oil Company, Esso-Mobil were at a time already operating in the Local Government Area.

However, crude oil was first discovered at Araromi Sea-side in 1908 and later at Ogogoro in 1952 even before it was discovered in River State in 1956. recently, the disputed on shore Oil wells formerly credited to Delta state have just been returned to Ondo State. They are as follows: Opuekepa, Omuro, Ojumole, Malu, Eko, Parabe, Minna, Bella, Obe, Esan, Ewa, Opolo, Opuama and Isekelwu oil fields.

Bitumen
Bitumen which will soon become the second world mineral resources after Crude Oil is found in large quantity in Ilaje Local Government Area e.g. Mahintedo, Igbo egunrin, Igbobi, Agerige, Araromi Sea-Side host of other communities. However, the proposed seaport and exchange zone to be cited at Araromi Sea-Side will serve as a means of exporting the product and its products to other parts of the world.

Fishing terminal, Igbokoda
The foremost role played by this Local Government in national fish production has motivated the Federal Government to establish the Multi Million naira Terminal at Igbokoda, bearing in mind the abundant local experience, labour supply direct access to the sea proposed entrance for big fishing vessels, creeks and rivers, the fishing industry remains attractive to willing investors, it has been designed mainly for large scale fishing, but subsistence fishermen equally find it useful for storage purposes.

Boat-building industry
Apart from the Boat yard at Igbokoda, the first Dockyard was at Ayetoro and later Orike Iwamimo, Olotu kuwo. A few other towns engage in boat building and essentially through cooperative efforts. The need for the supply of more boats since about 75% of the Local Government is Riverine. There is also need for improved technology in the business of boat building in order to boast productivity. This is a vacuum that could be filled by potential investors.

Other industries

Oil-producing mill

There is large oil palm estate maintained in Ilaje Local Government Area. Besides the wide spread of lands which abound in Mahin, Araromi, Ilumeje and Aheri Area of the Local Government is suitable for the existing oil mills and palm plantation and the fruits can be sourced from the estates.

Ogogoro/alcohol distillery and palm wine tapping

The business dots all parts of the Local Government because of the availability of palm tree. However, improved mechanized distillery to boost large scale production on industrial alcohol is attainable. This orders a challenge to the world of investors.

Mat-weaving industry

The raw materials for this are also sourced locally. Raffia Palms form the basis of the mat weaving, in the entire Local Government but the current level of mat making can be increased through the introduction of modern implements or method of mat making.

Raw materials

1. Water Hyacinth, available in large quantity and uses for production of fertilizer, insecticide, mosquito coils etc.,
2. Livestock, Cuc, SWillC, Chicks it! Incat
3. Palm fruit for producing such as:
a. Palm fruit for producing red oil
b. Rafia palm for building bag weaving etc.
c. Palm kernel and nuts for producing pomade soap.
d. Palm wine for consumption; coconut oil fibre, products
e. Log trees for making planks, long fibre pulp for Newsprints and paper production.
f. Other farm produce include cassava, rice plantation, maize Okro, pawpaw, cashew, vegetable all of which have domestic and industrial purpose.
g. Animal husbandry is possible all year round because of the perennial presence of green grass for grazing in every part of the Local Government.

Major occupation

Fishing is the major occupation of the Ilajes. This is enhanced by about 75% of the area being Riverine and easy access to the sea. This large scale fishing attracts traders and consumers from the nooks and crannies of the country. Of course, the largest fish market in Nigeria is situated in Igbokoda, the Headquarters of the Local Government. While timber portions of the timbers are essentially transported to Lagos for sales by means of the sea/water.

Tourism

Ilaje Local Government is a national tourist attraction with a shore line of about 180 km in Nigeria.

Numerous developments in water transportation and house construction on partially or completely flooded areas are also veritable tourist attraction. Lekki Peninsula in Lagos State to Ilaje Local Government along the Atlantic Coast is about 30kilometres when proposes coastal road from Lagos is completed. On road, Igbokoda to Lagos is less than three hours drive through part of Benin. Shagamu and later Lagos Ibadan expressways. It is possible to supervise business in Igbokoda while resident in Lagos.
Visitors to the main beach of the Local Government Headquarters (Igbokoda) reveals a sculpture of a fisherman. Also present at the main beach are hundreds of decorated ferry boats as though preparing for a boat race frusta.

Numerous cultural/traditional activities and mementos abound in the Local Government Area. For instance the Ayelala Shrine, which exist at a river junction called “It a Ayelala”, is only a few kilometers from the Local Government Headquarters. Ayelala is a powerful and widely respected goddess because of its capacity and wizards caught up in the clutches of Ayelala are known to confess their sins in the open.

References

Local Government Areas in Ondo State
Populated coastal places in Nigeria
Local Government Areas in Yorubaland
Slums in Nigeria